Syracosphaera is a genus of coccolithophore. Species include:

 Syracosphaera azureaplaneta 
 Syracosphaera corolla

References

Haptophyte genera